Mborokua (also known as Mary Island) is an uninhabited, jungle-covered volcanic island 30 km west of the Russell Islands. It is occasionally visited by local fishermen, as well as by dive tours.

See also

 Desert island
 List of islands

External links
 Satellite view of Mborokua from Google Maps

Uninhabited islands of the Solomon Islands
Western Province (Solomon Islands)